Perissomyrmex is a genus of ants in the subfamily Myrmicinae. It is known from the Neotropical and Oriental realms.

The genus was first described in 1947 from two workers discovered in Hoboken plant quarantine in New Jersey, United States. The ants were found in the root of a Begonia plant that had been shipped from Guatemala. Due to the genus' close affinities to the exclusively Old World genus Pristomyrmex, it was thought that the ants had been brought to the US via Guatemala from the Oriental or the Indo-Australian regions. However, with the later rediscovery of Perissomyrmex in Central America, the disjunct distribution could be confirmed.

Species
Perissomyrmex bidentatus Zhou & Huang, 2006
Perissomyrmex fissus Xu & Wang, 2004
Perissomyrmex guizhouensis Zhou & Huang, 2006
Perissomyrmex medogensis Xu & Zhang, 2012
Perissomyrmex monticola Baroni Urbani & De Andrade, 1993
Perissomyrmex snyderi Smith, 1947

References

External links

Myrmicinae
Ant genera